HMAS Stalwart is the second of the Navantia built  for the Royal Australian Navy. It had its keel laid in November 2018 as a part of the SEA 1654 Phase 3 project. HMAS Stalwart (III) and her sister ship HMAS Supply (II) replace HMAS Success and HMAS Sirius with a single class of two auxiliary oiler replenisher (AOR) ships to sustain deployed maritime forces.

The two ships are based on the Spanish Cantabria class and were built at the Ferrol shipyard. As of March 2021, the vessel began sea trials in Spain though work on her was running about eight months behind schedule. She arrived in Australia in June 2021 for her final fit out with Australian-specific equipment. Stalwart was commissioned on 13 November 2021 at Fleet Base West.

References

Supply-class replenishment oilers
2019 ships
Ships built in Spain